The following is a list of events affecting Philippine television in 2004. Events listed include television show debuts, finales, cancellations, and channel launches, closures and rebrandings, as well as information about controversies and carriage disputes.

Events
 January 3 – Erik Santos was hailed as the first-ever Star in a Million Grand Champion.
 February 1 – Mark Herras was hailed as Ultimate Male Survivor while Jennylyn Mercado was hailed as Ultimate Female Survivor for GMA Network's reality star search StarStruck. 
 March 1 - ETC was launched by Solar Entertainment Corporation as a female-oriented cable channel. On January 1, 2008, it began to lease airtime on SBN choosing to broadcast programming from its entertainment channel on UHF free-to-air television channel 21 until March 1, 2011. This partnership ended on March 2, 2011, as Solar transferred ETC to RPN on VHF free-to-air television channel 9. But on November 30, 2013, the channel returned to SBN.
 March 12 – Frontpage: Ulat ni Mel Tiangco, the early-evening national solo-anchored newscast, ended its two-year run as an early-evening national newscast and Mike Enriquez leaves the late-night newscast Saksi.
 March 13 – Rachelle Ann Go was hailed as the Search for a Star Grand Champion.
 March 15 – 24 Oras, the fourth early-evening national newscast in Filipino of GMA Network, was launched with "Frontpage" anchor Mel Tiangco and Saksi anchor Mike Enriquez. A brand-new Saksi with Emergency and Unang Hirit host Arnold Clavio joined Vicky Morales as her co-anchor and re-titled as "Saksi: Liga ng Katotohanan".
 November 18 – Asia's longest-running noontime show Eat Bulaga! celebrated its 25th silver anniversary via a TV Special called Eat Bulaga Silver Special with a grand celebration held at the Expo Filipino in Clark Air Base, Angeles City, Pampanga. 
 November 22 - TV Patrol became TV Patrol World and Julius Babao was joined by Karen Davila and Ted Failon, replacing Korina Sanchez during the first TV Patrol era. Sanchez replaced its original anchor Noli de Castro three years ago due to his election as senator and became vice president this year.

Premieres

Unknown dates
August:
 Entertainment Tonight on ETC
 One Tree Hill on ETC
 NBC Nightly News on ETC
 The Today Show on ETC
 Dateline on ETC
 Seinfeld on ETC
 Significant Others on ETC
 Change of Heart on ETC
November:
 Feel 100% on ABS-CBN 2

Unknown
3R on GMA 7
SMC's Dayriser on GMA 7
Good Morning, Teacher on GMA 7
Kerygma TV on SBN 21
Friends Again on SBN 21
Jesus: Lord Of The Nations on SBN 21
Oras ng Katotohanan on SBN 21
Tinig ng Kanayng Pagbabalik on SBN 21
Legal Forum on ZOE TV 11
New Life TV Shopping on ZOE TV 11
America's Next Top Model on Studio 23
Citizen Pinoy on ANC
Weekend Love on ABS-CBN 2
Kaya Mo Ba 'To? on ABS-CBN 2
Pirated CD, Celebrity Disguise on ABS-CBN 2
To the Max on ABS-CBN 2
Trip Kita, The Search for the Next Colgate Endorser on ABS-CBN 2
Victim Undercover on ABS-CBN 2
Silip; Sining sa Lipunan on ABS-CBN 2
Kape't Pandasal on ABS-CBN 2
Impact with Max Soliven on ABS-CBN 2
100 Deeds for Eddie McDowd on ABS-CBN 2
Sports Desk on Solar Sports
EZ Shop on NBN 4/RPN 9/IBC 13
Home Shopping Network on IBC 13
Serbis on the Go on IBC 13
Manny Pacquiao Sports Idol on IBC 13
Frontlines on ABC 5
Art Is Kool on ABC 5
Chikiting Patrol on ABC 5
KNN: Kabataan News Network on ABC 5
How 'Bout My Place on ABC 5
Island Flavors on ABC 5
Community Mass On ABC on ABC 5
Three Blind Dates on ABC 5
Pops Talk Show on ABC 5
Look Who's Talking on ABC 5
DMV: Dream Music Videos on ABC 5
Mom Ko To! on ABC 5
World Made Flash on ABC 5
Ringside on ABC 5
Lizzie McGuire on ABC 5
The Basketball Show on ABC 5
Insight Inside on RPN 9
Oh Yes, Johnny's Back! on RPN 9
Barkada Trip on Studio 23
The Planet on Net 25
Ilaw ng Kaligtasan on Net 25
What's Up Doc? on UNTV 37
Ads Unlimited on UNTV 37
Pangarap ng Puso on UNTV 37
Ayon sa Bibliya on UNTV 37
Workshop on TV on UNTV 37
Ano sa Palagay Mo? on UNTV 37
Kids at Work on UNTV 37
Teleskwela on UNTV 37
KNC on UNTV 37
Kakampi Mo Ang Batas on UNTV 37
Sound Connections on UNTV 37
Truth in Focus on UNTV 37
FAQ's on UNTV 37
Make My Day with Larry Henares on UNTV 37
Mr. Fix It on UNTV 37
Kulay Pinoy on UNTV 37
Chika Mo, Chika Ko on UNTV 37
Serbisyo Publiko on UNTV 37
Mr. Bean: The Animated Series on ABS-CBN 2
Isabella on ABS-CBN 2

Returning or renamed programs

Programs transferring networks

Finales
 January 9: Eternity: A Chinese Ghost Story (ABS-CBN 2)
 February 1:
 Feel at Home (ABS-CBN 2)
 StarStruck (season 1) (GMA 7)
 February 8: Partners Mel and Jay (GMA 7)
 February 15:
 Ispup (ABC 5)
 Sunday Night Movies (ABC 5)
 February 16: The Big Night (ABC 5)
 February 18: Whattamen (ABS-CBN 2)
 February 20: 
 Masayang Tanghali Bayan (ABS-CBN 2)
 Retro TV (IBC 13)
 The Truth (ABS-CBN)
 Friday Box Office (ABC 5)
 February 21: Saturday Night Movies (ABC 5)
 February 27:
 Walang Hanggan (GMA 7)
 Funny Wild Girl (GMA 7)
 February 28: Knowledge Power (ABS-CBN 2)
 March 5: 
 Narito ang Puso Ko (GMA 7)
 Endless Love: Winter Sonata (GMA 7) 
 March 12: 
 Frontpage: Ulat ni Mel Tiangco (GMA 7)
 Saksi (GMA 7)
 March 13: Search for a Star (GMA 7)
 March 19:
 My Annette (GMA 7)
 Starry, Starry Night (GMA 7)
 March 20: Berks (ABS-CBN 2)
 March 26: Loving You (GMA 7)
 March 27: Super Yoyo (GMA 7)
 April 3: Art is-Kool (GMA 7)
 April 7: Balitang Balita (ABC 5)
 April 11: Live on 5 (ABC 5)
 April 18: Magandang Umaga, Bayan Weekend (ABS-CBN 2)
 May 8: Buttercup (ABS-CBN 2)
 May 21:
 Love Storm (GMA 7)
 Guardian Angel (GMA 7)
 May 27: American Idol (season 3) (ABC 5)
 May 28: Morning Girls with Kris and Korina (ABS-CBN 2)
 May 30: Lukso ng Dugo (ABS-CBN 2)
 June 5: Star Circle Quest (season 1) (ABS-CBN 2)
 June 18: Twin Hearts (GMA 7)
 June 19: Simpleng Hiling (ABS-CBN 2)
 June 26: 
 StarStruck Kids (GMA 7)
 Celebrity Turns (GMA 7)
 July 9: Sana'y Wala Nang Wakas (ABS-CBN 2)
 July 16: Endless Love: Summer Scent (GMA 7)
 July 24: Click (GMA 7)
 July 25: Partners with Mel Tiangco (GMA 7)
 July 30: Hanggang Kailan (GMA 7)
 August 13: 30 Days (GMA 7)
 August 21: 
 Kakabakaba Adventures (GMA 7)
 Star in a Million (ABS-CBN 2)
 September 7:
 All Together Now (GMA 7)
 September 10: Basta't Kasama Kita (ABS-CBN 2)
 September 17: 
 Te Amo, Maging Sino Ka Man (GMA 7)
 Sunshine of Love (ABS-CBN 2)
 Four Sisters (ABS-CBN 2)
 September 24: Love Letter (GMA 7)
 October 1:
 Ikaw sa Puso Ko (GMA 7)
 Marinara (GMA 7)
 October 8: 
 Mangarap Ka (ABS-CBN 2)
 Good Morning, Kris (ABS-CBN 2)
 October 15: Twin Sisters (GMA 7)
 October 22: Sarah the Teen Princess (ABS-CBN 2)
 October 24: Love in the City (ABS-CBN 2)
 November 12: Marina (ABS-CBN 2)
 November 19:
 TV Patrol (ABS-CBN 2)
 Maid in Heaven (ABS-CBN 2)
 First Love (ABS-CBN 2)
 December 4: Out! (GMA 7)
 December 10: It Might Be You (ABS-CBN 2)
 December 17: Snow Angel (GMA 7)
 December 31:
 TV Patrol Tuguegarao (ABS-CBN TV-3 Tuguegarao)
 TV Patrol Iligan (ABS-CBN TV-2 Iligan)

Unknown dates
April: Westside Story (ABS-CBN 2)

Unknown
 All About You (GMA 7)
 In Touch with Charles Stanley (GMA 7)
 Lakas Magsasaka (GMA 7)
 Good Morning, Teacher (GMA 7)
 Paulina (GMA 7)
 Maria del Carmen  (GMA 7)
 Detek Kids (ABS-CBN 2)
 Silip; Sining sa Lipunan (ABS-CBN 2)
 Digital LG Quiz (GMA 7)
 Ang Tamang Daan (SBN 21)
 Edgemont (ZOE TV 11)
 Fantasy (ABS-CBN 2)
 On-Air (ABC 5)
 SINGLE (ABC 5)
 Game Extreme Channel (ABC 5)
 Kool on Kam (ABC 5)
 Armor of God (RJTV 29)
 BYK101 (IBC 13)
 LakbayTV (IBC 13)
 Game Channel (IBC 13)
 Celebrity DAT Com (IBC 13)
 Travel: Philippines (IBC 13)
 Powerline (IBC 13)
 Manny Pacquiao Sports Idol (IBC 13)
 Magbuhay Professional (NBN 4)
 Patrol 117 (NBN 4)
 Largo (RPN 9)
 How 'Bout My Place (RPN 9)
 Novartis Payo ni Doc (RPN 9)
 Madam Ratsa Live! (RPN 9)
 The Doctor is In (RPN 9)
 Islands Life (RPN 9)
 OPTV (RPN 9)
 Por ti (ABS-CBN 2)
 Promise (ABS-CBN 2)
 Pirated CD, Celebrity Disguise (ABS-CBN 2)
 To The Max (ABS-CBN 2)
 Trip Kita, The Search for the Next Colgate Endorser (ABS-CBN 2)
 Teysi (ABS-CBN 2)
 Dong Puno Tonight (ABS-CBN 2)
 Sapul Kayo Diyan! (ABS-CBN 2)
 Special Assignment (ABS-CBN 2)
 Tara Tena (ABS-CBN 2)
 Victim (ABS-CBN 2)
 Weekend Love (ABS-CBN 2)
 Silip; Sining sa Lipunan (ABS-CBN 2)
 Impact with Max Soliven (ABS-CBN 2)
 Bread of Life (ABS-CBN 2)
 Home Grown (Net 25)
 Our House (Net 25)
 Wheel 2000 (Net 25)
 L'il Horrors (Net 25)
 Audio File (Net 25)
 Beyond 2000 (Net 25)
 Call for Help (Net 25)
 Cyberdoodoo (Net 25)
 NET Café (Net 25)
 Next Step (Net 25)
 www.com (Net 25)
 Zip File (Net 25)
 In the Raw (UNTV 37)
 Out of Time (UNTV 37)
 Luisa (ABS-CBN 2)
 Solita Mi Amor (ABS-CBN 2)
 Epol/Apple (ABS-CBN 2)
 Math-Tinik (ABS-CBN 2)
 Sineskwela (ABS-CBN 2)
 Del Monte Kitchenomics (ABS-CBN 2)

Networks

Launches
 January 17: Sports Plus
 January 18: Animax Asia
 March 1 : ETC
 July 22 : The Mabuhay Channel

Closures

Unknown
 DBS 35

Births
January 1 - Dhao Mac Macasipot, dancer
January 27 –
 Xyriel Manabat, actress
 Francine Diaz, actress
February 20 – Franzell Placido, student and player
March 3 - Izzy Canillo, actor
March 8 - Brenna Garcia, actress
March 12 - Darlene Vibares, singer
March 18 - Avery Balasbas, actress
March 26 - Dani Porter, actress
April 16 - Elha Nympha, singer
May 29 - Noel Comia Jr., actor, model, singer, and former host of Team Yey!
July 29 - Juan Gabriel Tiongson, son of Sweet Plantado Tiongson of The CompanY & Trumpets Playshop Kids
August 19 - Mona Alawi, actress and model
September 13 - Criza Taa, actress
October 1 - Raven Cajuguiran, actress and former host of Team Yey!
October 6 - Cha-Cha Cañete, actress and singer
October 13 - Luke James Alford, singer, actor and former host of Team Yey!
November 13 - Elijah Alejo, actress
November 14 - Veyda Inoval, actress
November 21 - Lyca Gairanod, singer and actress
December 15 - Clarence Delgado, actor
December 25 - Sam Shoaf, singer, actor and former host of Team Yey!

Deaths
February 18 - Frankie Evangelista, 69, former radio-TV anchor (born July 24, 1934)
February 21 - Nestor de Villa, 75, former actor (born July 6, 1928)
March 4 - Halina Perez, 22, former sexy star (born December 11, 1981)
April 27 - Larry Silva, 66, former actor and comedian (born 1937)
July 31 - Roger Mariano, 44, former DZJC anchor (born 1960)
August 14 - Bomber Moran, 59, former actor (born October 18, 1944)
August 30 - Dely Atay-Atayan, 90, former comedian (born March 17, 1914)
September 24 - Christopher Misajon, 31, former GMA Iloilo correspondent (born 1973)
September 26 - Beda Orquejo, 55, TV Director/Editor/Cameraman of Family Rosary Crusade (born 1948)
October 4 - Rio Diaz, 45, former TV host/actress/beauty queen (born 1959)
November 10 - Katy de la Cruz. 97, singer, actress, known as "Queen of Bodabil" (born 1907)
November 19 - George Canseco, 70, Filipino song composer (born April 23, 1934)

See also
2004 in television

References

 
Television in the Philippines by year
Philippine television-related lists